The 2015 MAVTV 500 IndyCar race was an open-wheel motorsport event held on June 27, 2015, at the  oval course at the Auto Club Speedway in Fontana, California. It marked the 11th round of the 2015 season and unlike the previous season, was not the championship's final race of the season.

The race featured an IndyCar Series record 80 lead changes. The race was the first race since the 2011 IZOD IndyCar World Championship to feature pack-style racing. While many observers applauded the race as being the most exciting race in IndyCar history (Jan Wagner of the Del Mar Times called it "one of the best IndyCar races ever"), others questioned the racing as being too dangerous. The race ended with a spectacular airborne crash from Ryan Briscoe, who was uninjured.

Report

Qualifying 
Initial practice and qualifying took place in the afternoon on Friday June 27, 2015 with a final practice occurring later that evening.

Race results

Championship standings after the race 

Drivers' standings

 Note: Only the top five positions are included.

References

External links
 
 IndyCar Toronto event page

MAVTV 500
MAVTV 500
MAVTV 500